Grief Street is a 1931 American pre-Code mystery crime film directed by Richard Thorpe and starring Barbara Kent and John Holland. It was produced and distributed by the Chesterfield Motion Pictures Corporation.

Plot
A womanizing matinée idol is found strangled in his dressing room. The door is locked from the inside and there is no other way into the room. He had been having an affair with his leading lady, while his actress wife is doing the same with the stage manager. Everyone, including a young actress who had been fired from the play, and an old actor now relegated to a stage-doorman, has a motive. The explanation for the murder lies within the script of the play.

Cast
Barbara Kent as Jean Royce
John Holland as Jim Ryan
Dorothy Christy as Mrs. Alvin Merle aka Ethel Wynn
Crauford Kent as Alvin Merle
Lillian Rich as Pamela Gregory
James P. Burtis as Police Sgt. Jardine
Larry Steers as Ralph Burns
Lloyd Whitlock as Frank Murray
Lafe McKee as Michael - Stage Doorman
Creighton Hale as Ted
Raymond Largay as Police Capt. Blake
Walter Brennan as Walt

External links

1931 films
American crime films
1930s mystery films
1930s crime films
1930s romance films
1930s English-language films
American black-and-white films
American mystery films
Chesterfield Pictures films
Films directed by Richard Thorpe
1930s American films